Tonight We Ride is the twelfth studio album by American singer-songwriter Michael Martin Murphey and his first for Warner Bros. Records. Released in 1986, the album was produced by Jim Ed Norman and contains guest performances by Holly Dunn, Reggie Young, Mark O'Connor, Charlie McCoy, and J.D. Souther. The album's title track was also its first single. The album peaked at number 46 on the Billboard Top Country Albums chart.

Track listing

Credits
Music
 Michael Martin Murphey – lead vocals, guitar, banjo
 Fred Carter Jr. – guitar
 Paul Worley – guitar
 Steve Gibson – guitar
 Reggie Young – electric guitar
 Josh Leo – guitar, mandolin
 Sonny Garrish – steel guitar
 Carmen Acciaioli – steel guitar
 Buddy Emmons – steel guitar
 Mitch Humphries – piano, synthesizer
 Barry Beckett – piano
 Dennis Burnside – piano, synthesizer
 John Jarvis – piano, synthesizer
 David Hoffner – synthesizer, piano
 Mark O'Connor – fiddle
 Charlie McCoy – harmonica
 Michael Rhodes – bass
 Michael Bowden – bass
 Eddie Bayers – drums
 Pam Tillis – vocals
 J.D. Souther – background vocals
 Gary Pigg – background vocals
 Robb Strandlund – background vocals
 Thomas Flora – background vocals
 Sonny Throckmorton – background vocals
 Michael Lund – background vocals

Production
 Nick DeCaro – arranger
 Bergen White – arranger
 Scott Hendricks – engineer
 Chris Hammond – assistant engineer
 Eric Prestidge – engineer, mastering, mixing
 Lee Groizsch – assistant engineer, mixing assistant
 Glenn Meadows – mastering
 Kurt Markus – photography
 W.C. Matthews – design

Chart performance

References

External links
 Michael Martin Murphey's Official Website

1986 albums
Michael Martin Murphey albums
Warner Records albums
Albums produced by Jim Ed Norman